Formothion (chemical formula: C6H12NO4PS2) is a chemical compound used in acaricides and insecticides.

References

Acetylcholinesterase inhibitors
Organophosphate insecticides
Acaricides
Methyl esters
Formamides